Bocchoris tenera is a moth of the family Crambidae. It is found from South Asia.

References

Spilomelinae
Moths of Asia
Moths described in 1859